The Kakushintō ("Reformist Party") was a political party in Japan.

History
The party was established on 3 June 1927 by a group of National Diet members from the Shinsei Club, all of whom had previously been members of the Kakushin Club. It nominated 15 candidates for the 1928 general elections, winning three seats. In April one of its members, Ichirō Kiyose, left the party after being appointed Deputy Speaker of the House of Representatives. It won three seats again in the 1930 elections, but was reduced to two seats in the February 1932 elections. It was subsequently dissolved on 25 July that year.

Election results

References

Defunct political parties in Japan
Political parties established in 1927
1927 establishments in Japan
Political parties disestablished in 1932
1932 disestablishments in Japan